Baron Jean Michel P.M.G. de Selys Longchamps DFC (31 May 1912 – 16 August 1943) was a Belgian aristocrat and RAF fighter pilot during World War II. He is chiefly known for his single-handed attack on the Gestapo headquarters in Brussels in German-occupied Belgium.

Early life 

Jean de Selys Longchamps DFC was born into Belgian nobility, historically residing in Longchamps Castle (now a gîte) in Borgworm near Liège. He inherited the title of baron from his father, Baron Raymond Charles Michel Ghislain de Selys Longchamps. He dropped out of the Catholic University of Leuven and then started his professional career as a bank clerk.

Early military career 

At the outbreak of the war, Selys Longchamps was drafted into the Belgian Army, in which he was commissioned as a cavalry officer with the 1er Régiment des Guides. He managed to escape with the British forces from Dunkirk, only to return to France shortly after and be faced with France's capitulation. He tried to join the allies again by way of Morocco, where he was arrested by the Vichy authorities and sent into internment in Marseille. He escaped and traveling via Spain was able to reach Britain, where he - after purporting to be younger than his age of 28 - was accepted for flight training with the RAF. He was posted to No. 609 Squadron RAF and flying Hawker Typhoons quickly made a name as an able and aggressive pilot.

Attack on the Gestapo headquarters in Brussels 

Immediately upon the fall of Belgium on May 10, 1940, the Gestapo commandeered Résidence Belvédère, a luxurious Art Deco apartment building located at 453 Avenue Louise in Brussels as its headquarters, and tortured prisoners in its cellars.

Longchamps' father had died under torture at the hands of the Sicherheitspolizei (SiPo).

Longchamps devised a plan to strafe the building, which RAF command repeatedly declined.

Longchamps first flew his Typhoon down the Avenue Louise to make a high-speed pass of the target building, reportedly to have the roar of the Napier Sabre engine draw Gestapo personnel to the unprotected windows. Using the ample manoeuvering space above the Bois de la Cambre parc, he then turned to the  Avenue de la Nation, using it as a low-level attack path. He continued through the left turn of the connecting Avenue Emile De Mot to an unobstructed and fairly frontal firing position with little risk of collateral damage and raked the target with his four 20 mm Hispano autocannons, resulting in the death of SS-Obersturmführer Werner Vogt of the SiPo, SS-Sturmbannführer Alfred Thomas, head of Abteiling III of the Sicherheitsdienst (SD) in Belgium, a high-ranking Gestapo officer named Müller, and others.

Longchamps had a bag of small Belgian flags made by Belgian refugee schoolchildren in London. After the attack, he scattered the small Belgian flags across Brussels, dropped a Union Jack and a large Belgian flag at the Royal Palace in Laeken, and dropped another at the garden of his niece, the Baroness de Villegas de Saint-Pierre.

Aftermath

Upon his return, Longchamps was reprimanded for acting without orders and demoted to pilot officer. However, he was soon after awarded the Distinguished Flying Cross for his actions. After the attack, some resistance sources claimed a death toll as high as thirty, and the Nazis admitted four fatalities and five serious injuries.
A bust near the site commemorates Longchamps' actions.

Death

On August 16, 1943, Selys Longchamps was killed while attempting to land at RAF Manston, his landing gear having been damaged by German Flak during a mission over Ostend.
He is buried in Minster-in-Thanet. A commemoration of his life was held on 16 August 2013 in conjunction with the Royal British Legion and Wings Of Memory from Belgium.

Honours and awards

 Knight of the order of Leopold (posthumous)
 War cross WWII with palm
 Distinguished flying cross (United Kingdom)

Family

Jean's brother, Michel-François de Selys, is the father of Baroness Sybille de Selys Longchamps, the former mistress of King Albert II, with whom she has a daughter, Princess Delphine (who since October 2020 can legally wear the title of "Her Royal Highness"). Her legal name though is now Delphine Saxe-Coburg.

See also
Ken Gatward#Operation Squabble

References
Notes

Citations

Bibliography
 

1912 births
1943 deaths
Nobility from Brussels
Barons of Belgium
Belgian Army officers
Belgian people imprisoned abroad
Prisoners and detainees of Vichy France
Belgian escapees
Escapees from French detention
Belgian World War II pilots
Royal Air Force officers
Belgian Royal Air Force personnel of World War II
Aviators killed in aviation accidents or incidents in England
Royal Air Force personnel killed in World War II
Recipients of the Distinguished Flying Cross (United Kingdom)
Belgian military personnel of World War II
Victims of aviation accidents or incidents in 1943
Military personnel from Brussels
Belgian aviators